Ischnurges bagoasalis is a moth in the family Crambidae. It was described by Herbert Druce in 1899. It is found in Mexico.

References

Moths described in 1899
Spilomelinae
Moths of Central America